= Rinehart Lake =

American body of water

- Location within Wisconsin Location within the United States
- Location: Portage County, Wisconsin
- Coordinates: 44°31′08″N 89°16′07″W
- Type: lake
- Etymology: Frederick Reinhardt, a pioneer citizen
- Basin countries: United States
- Surface elevation: 1,086 ft (331 m)

Rinehart Lake is a lake in the U.S. state of Wisconsin.

The lake derives its name from Frederick Reinhardt, a pioneer citizen.
